Paul Rogers may refer to:

 Paul Rogers (academic) (born 1943), professor of peace studies at the University of Bradford
 Paul Rogers (actor) (1917–2013), English actor
 Paul Rogers (basketball) (born 1973), Australian basketball player
 Paul Rogers (bassist) (born 1956), English bassist
 Paul Rogers (film editor), American film editor
 Paul Rogers (footballer) (born 1965), English football (soccer) player
 Paul Rogers (novelist) (1936–1984), American novelist
 Paul Rogers (politician) (1921–2008), American lawyer and politician
 Paul D. Rogers (fl. 1980s–2020s), U.S. Army Major General and Michigan's 34th State Adjutant General

See also
 Franklin Paul Rogers (1905–1990), American tattoo artist
 Paul Rodgers (born 1949), singer
 Paul Rodgers (footballer) (born 1989), English football player